is a Japanese politician. He is a member of the House of Representatives in the Diet (national legislature). He was appointed  Chairman of the National Public Safety Commission, Minister of State for Consumer Affairs and Food Safety and Minister for the Abduction Issue. Matsubara was formerly affiliated with Party of Hope and the Democratic Party (the Democratic Party of Japan).

Political career

In the first cabinet reshuffle of Democratic Party Prime Minister Yoshihiko Noda on 13 January 2012 he was appointed Chairman of the National Public Safety Commission, Minister of State for Consumer Affairs and Food Safety and Minister for the Abduction Issue. He left the cabinet on the 1 October 2012 cabinet reshuffle. Tadamasa Kodaira replaced him as Chairman of the National Public Safety Commission and Minister of State for Consumer Affairs and Food Safety, and Keishu Tanaka took over as Minister for the Abduction Issue.

Personal life
Matsubara is married with three children.
His oldest son Hajime Matsubara is a member of the Ota city assembly.

Views on Second World War
He was a supporter of right-wing filmmaker Satoru Mizushima's 2007 denialist film The Truth about Nanjing, which denied that the Nanking Massacre ever occurred. In 2014 he refused to retract his comments denying the massacre.

During Diet discussions of Japanese government efforts to clean up chemical weapons abandoned in China at the end of the Second World War, Matsubara questioned the existence of such weapons.

On Monday 27 August 2012 Matsubara told a House of Councillors budget committee meeting that he may propose to other ministers a review of the 1993 statement by then Chief Cabinet Secretary Yōhei Kōno admitting the Imperial Japanese Army's role in establishing and running "comfort stations" for troops with forcibly recruited comfort women, because "no direct descriptions of forcible recruitment have been found in military and other Japanese official records obtained by the government."

Visits to Yasukuni shrine
On 15 August 2012 Matsubara, along with  Minister of Land, Infrastructure, Transport and Tourism Yuichiro Hata became the first cabinet ministers of the DPJ to openly visit the controversial Yasukuni Shrine on 15 August since the party came to power in 2009. Matsubara made his visit to commemorate the 67th anniversary of the end of World War II despite requests from South Korea to refrain from doing so, and despite Prime Minister Yoshihiko Noda requesting his cabinet not to do so.

References

External links 
  in Japanese.

Members of the House of Representatives from Tokyo
Members of the Tokyo Metropolitan Assembly
Members of Nippon Kaigi
North Korean abductions of Japanese citizens
Nanjing Massacre deniers
Japanese anti-communists
Waseda University alumni
People from Itabashi
Living people
1956 births
Democratic Party of Japan politicians
Noda cabinet
21st-century Japanese politicians
Historical negationism